The England national cricket team toured New Zealand between February and April 2002 to play a five-match One Day International series against the New Zealand national cricket team, followed by a three-match Test series. New Zealand won the ODI series 3-2, while the Test series was drawn 1-1.

Tour matches

List A: Northern Districts v England XI

List A: Northern Districts v England XI

First Class: Otago v England XI

First Class: Canterbury v England XI

ODI series

1st ODI

2nd ODI

3rd ODI

4th ODI

5th ODI

Test series

1st Test

2nd Test

3rd Test

External sources
 CricInfo

References

2002 in English cricket
2001–02 New Zealand cricket season
2001-02
International cricket competitions in 2001–02
2002 in New Zealand cricket